Basil Al-Sayyali (born 22 June 2001) is a Saudi Arabian professional footballer who plays as a midfielder for Al-Hazem on loan from Al-Nassr.

Career
Al-Sayyali began his career at the youth team of Al-Nassr. On 2 February 2020, he signed his first professional contract with the club. He was first called up to the first team in April 2021 during the 2021 AFC Champions League group stages. On 7 July 2021, Al-Sayyali joined newly-promoted club Al-Tai on loan until the end of the season. He made his debut on 23 September 2021 in the 4–2 win over Al-Ettifaq. His loan was cut short on 21 January 2022 and Al-Sayyali returned to Al-Nassr. On 27 August 2022, Al-Sayyali joined Al-Hazem on loan. On 16 March 2023, Al-Sayyali joined Al-Hazem on a permanent deal signing a four-year contract. On 17 March 2023, Al-Sayyali was called up to the Saudi Arabia national under-23 team for the first time.

References

External links

2001 births
Living people
Association football midfielders
Saudi Arabian footballers
Saudi Arabia youth international footballers
Al Nassr FC players
Al-Tai FC players
Al-Hazem F.C. players
Saudi Professional League players
Saudi First Division League players